The American Kickboxing Academy (AKA) is a martial arts gym based in San Jose, California. It is one of the pioneering schools of mixed martial arts (MMA). In 2014, AKA opened the AKA Thailand gym in Phuket, Thailand. Prominent trainers include Brazilian Jiu-Jitsu master Leandro Vieira, Bob Cook, Derek Yuen, Javier"Beaner"Mendez, and Andy Fong.  Within the facility, Muay Thai, Kickboxing, Brazilian Jiu-Jitsu, Wrestling and Boxing classes are taught.  Additional programs include conditioning and circuit training with TRX Suspension and Combat Circuit. The AKA is one of the top professional MMA training camps.

Dispute with the Ultimate Fighting Championship 
In 2008, the AKA was involved in a brief dispute with Ultimate Fighting Championship (UFC) President Dana White over the exclusive license rights for a UFC video game. Members of the AKA who were signed with the UFC, including Jon Fitch, Christian Wellisch, Josh Koscheck, and former UFC heavyweight champion Cain Velasquez, refused to sign an exclusive lifetime contract for their video game licenses over to the UFC, causing them to be cut from the UFC's roster. Within 24 hours, the dispute was resolved and all fighters signed back into the organization.

AKA has also been criticized by MMA fans and journalists, as well as by Dana White, for what is perceived as an excessively high rate of training injuries leading to fight cancellations among its stable of fighters.

Notable fighters

Mixed martial artists

Current

Islam Makhachev (UFC Lightweight Champion)
Usman Nurmagomedov (Bellator Lightweight Champion)
Umar Nurmagomedov (UFC)
Shawn Bunch (Bellator)
Islam Mamedov (Bellator, WSOF)
Liam McGeary (Former Bellator Light Heavyweight Champion)
Ed Ruth (Bellator)
Germaine de Randamie (Former UFC Women's Featherweight Champion, Strikeforce)
Marius Žaromskis (Bellator, Strikeforce)
Zubaira Tukhugov (UFC)
Ruslan Magomedov (UFC)
Brianna Fortino (UFC)
Dan Ige (UFC)
Deron Winn (UFC, Bellator)
Ousmane Thomas Diagne (Bellator, Strikeforce)
Arjan Bhullar (ONE FC Heavyweight Champion)
Tony Johnson (Bellator, One FC)
Tai Tuivasa (UFC)
Abubakar Nurmagomedov (UFC, PFL, WSOF)
Tagir Ulanbekov (UFC)
Gabriel Benítez (UFC)
Kyle Crutchmer (Bellator)

Notable alumni

Luke Rockhold (Former UFC Middleweight Champion, former Strikeforce Middleweight Champion)
Daniel Cormier (former UFC Heavyweight Champion, former UFC Light Heavyweight Champion, former Strikeforce Heavyweight Grand Prix Champion) 
Khabib Nurmagomedov (former UFC Lightweight Champion)
Cain Velasquez (former 2-time UFC Heavyweight champion)
BJ Penn (former UFC Lightweight Champion, former UFC Welterweight Champion)
Brian Johnston (1st UFC Fighter from AKA, Strikeforce, New Japan Pro Wrestling)
Leon Edwards (current UFC Welterweight Champion)
Jon Fitch (WSOF, UFC)
Josh Thomson (UFC, Strikeforce)
Josh Koscheck (UFC)
Frank Shamrock (UFC, Strikeforce)
Cung Le (UFC, Strikeforce)
Bobby Lashley (Bellator, Strikeforce)
Sean Sherk (UFC)
Daniel Puder (Strikeforce)
Billy Evangelista (WEC, Strikeforce)
Muhammed Lawal (Bellator, Strikeforce)
Miesha Tate (UFC, Strikeforce)
Bethe Correia (UFC)
Mike Swick (UFC)
Ron Keslar (Bellator, Strikeforce)
Kyle Kingsbury (UFC)
Andre Fialho (UFC)
Tyson Griffin (WSOF, UFC, Strikeforce)
Todd Duffee (UFC)
Phil Baroni (UFC, Bellator)
Gray Maynard (UFC)
Lavar Johnson (Bellator, UFC, WEC, Strikeforce)
Justin Wilcox (Bellator, Strikeforce)
Mike Kyle (WSOF, Strikeforce, UFC, WEC)
Trevor Prangley (KOTC, WSOF, Strikeforce, UFC)
Herschel Walker (Strikeforce)
Paul Buentello (WSOF, Strikeforce, UFC, Bellator)
Nate Moore (Strikeforce)
Rich Crunkilton (WEC)
Christian Wellisch (UFC, WEC)

Kickboxers 
 Travis Johnson

Boxers 

Ricardo Cortes
Matt Jannazzo

Wrestlers 

Khadzhimurat Gatsalov
Jamill Kelly
Nick Piccininni

Awards
MMAJunkie.com
2015 Gym of the Year

CombatPress.com
2018 Gym of the Year

See also
List of Top Professional MMA Training Camps

References

External links 
 Official Website
 AKA Thailand

Kickboxing training facilities
Mixed martial arts training facilities
Kickboxing in the United States
Sports in San Jose, California